The following television stations operate on virtual channel 18 in the United States:

 K04BJ-D in La Pine, Oregon
 K06GW-D in New Castle, Colorado
 K06HU-D in Aspen, Colorado
 K08OX-D in Thomasville, Colorado
 K09PJ-D in Ouray, Colorado
 K11PS-D in Collbran, Colorado
 K11RX-D in Big Arm, Montana
 K13SN-D in Nucla, Colorado
 K18BN-D in Glasgow, Montana
 K18DD-D in Camp Verde, Arizona
 K18DG-D in Alexandria, Minnesota
 K18GF-D in Little Falls, Minnesota
 K18HD-D in Bakersfield, California
 K18HQ-D in Sandpoint, Idaho
 K18KK-D in Columbia, Missouri
 K18NE-D in St. James, Minnesota
 K18NO-D in Lubbock, Texas
 K18NW-D in Minot, North Dakota
 K19HG-D in Redstone, Colorado
 K20JB-D in Hollis, Oklahoma
 K20OE-D in Silt, Colorado
 K21PE-D in Tyler, Texas
 K24JO-D in Crawford, Colorado
 K24MV-D in Fort Peck, Montana
 K25PC-D in Gateway, Colorado
 K26LH-D in Snowmass Village, Colorado
 K26ON-D in Deer Lodge, etc., Montana
 K27OV-D in Woody Creek, Colorado
 K28HA-D in Grand Valley, Colorado
 K31CW-D in Carbondale, Colorado
 K31IW-D in Ridgway, Colorado
 K32CW-D in Montrose, Colorado
 K32HL-D in Rulison, Colorado
 K32IC-D in Altus, Oklahoma
 K32NO-D in Glenwood Springs, Colorado
 K33HG-D in Quanah, Texas
 K33PB-D in Grand Junction, Colorado
 K35NS-D in Montrose, Colorado
 K35ON-D in Paonia, Colorado
 K36GX-D in Basalt, Colorado
 K36JZ-D in Roseburg, Oregon
 K43HD-D in Quanah, Texas
 KAAS-TV in Salina, Kansas
 KAJJ-CD in Kalispell, Montana
 KCEI-LD in Taos, New Mexico
 KCWH-LD in Lincoln, Nebraska
 KDKZ-LD in Farmington, Missouri
 KDOV-LD in Medford, Oregon
 KEGG-LD in Tulsa, Oklahoma
 KGSW-LD in Keene, Texas
 KHMP-LD in Las Vegas, Nevada
 KJTL in Wichita Falls, Texas
 KLJB in Davenport, Iowa
 KLRU in Austin, Texas
 KLTL-TV in Lake Charles, Louisiana
 KPFW-LD in Dallas, Texas
 KPTF-DT in Farwell, Texas
 KQRM-LD in Petaluma, California
 KRMJ in Grand Junction, Colorado
 KSCI in Long Beach, California
 KTEW-LD in Ponca City, Oklahoma
 KTTU in Tucson, Arizona
 KTVV-LD in Hot Springs, Arkansas
 KUEW in St. George, Utah
 KUPB in Midland, Texas
 KVPT in Fresno, California
 KWYB in Butte, Montana
 KXCY-LD in Cheyenne, Wyoming
 KXDP-LD in Denver, Colorado
 KZCS-LD in Colorado Springs, Colorado
 W18BB-D in Elizabeth City, North Carolina
 W18CJ in Quincy, Illinois
 W18DQ-D in Santa Isabel, Puerto Rico
 W18DZ-D in Ceiba, Puerto Rico
 W18EV-D in New Bern, North Carolina
 W18EW-D in Jackson, Tennessee
 W18FB-D in Sutton, West Virginia
 W22FC-D in Greenville, North Carolina
 W25FP-D in Young Harris, Georgia
 W32EV-D in Adamsville, Tennessee
 W34FH-D in Marion, etc., North Carolina
 W34FL-D in Harrisburg/Lancaster, Pennsylvania
 WBXC-CD in Champaign/Urbana, Illinois
 WBXN-CD in New Orleans, Louisiana
 WCCB in Charlotte, North Carolina
 WDFL-LD in Miami, Florida
 WDHN in Dothan, Alabama
 WDPM-DT in Mobile, Alabama
 WDWO-CD in Detroit, Michigan
 WECN in Naranjito, Puerto Rico
 WECP-LD in Panama City, FLorida
 WEID-LD in South Bend, Indiana
 WETM-TV in Elmira, New York
 WHIZ-TV in Zanesville, Ohio
 WHTV-LD in New York, New York
 WJTS-CD in Jasper, Indiana
 WKCF in Clermont, Florida
 WLCN-CD in Charleston, South Carolina
 WLEX-TV in Lexington, Kentucky
 WLFI-TV in Lafayette, Indiana
 WLHA-LD in Laurel, Mississippi
 WLZH-LD in Red Lion, Pennsylvania
 WMAV-TV in Oxford, Mississippi
 WNGH-TV in Chatsworth, Georgia
 WNPI-DT in Norwood, New York
 WQMK-LD in Cusseta, Alabama
 WQOW in Eau Claire, Wisconsin
 WSJP-LD in Aquadilla, Puerto Rico
 WSVT-LD in Tampa, Florida
 WUHO-LD in Kalamazoo, Michigan
 WUJX-LD in Jacksonville, Florida
 WURO-LD in Roscommon, Michigan
 WUVN in Hartford, Connecticut
 WVEO in Aguadilla, Puerto Rico
 WVTV in Milwaukee, Wisconsin
 WVVH-CD in Southampton, New York
 WXTM-LD in Erie, Pennsylvania

The following stations, which are no longer licensed, formerly operated on virtual channel 18 in the United States:
 K18IW-D in Rapid City, South Dakota
 KJVG-LD in Joplin, Missouri
 KTWN-LD in Little Rock, Arkansas
 WADA-LD in Wilmington, North Carolina
 WHNW-LD in Gary, Indiana
 WHTV in Jackson, Michigan

References

18 virtual